Slagelse railway station ( or Slagelse Banegård) is the main railway station serving the town of Slagelse in southwestern Zealand, Denmark. It is located in the centre of the town, on the northern edge of the historic town centre, and immediately adjacent to the Slagelse bus station.

Slagelse station is located on the main line Copenhagen–Fredericia railway from Copenhagen to Funen and Jutland. The station opened in 1856, and was moved to its current location in 1892. Its second and current station building designed by the architect Niels Peder Christian Holsøe was inaugurated in 1892.

The station offers direct InterCity services to Copenhagen, Funen and Jutland, regional rail services to Copenhagen and Odense operated by the national railway company DSB, as well as local train services to Tølløse, operated by the regional railway company Lokaltog.

Architecture 

Slagelse station's second and current station building was built from 1891 to 1892 to designs by the Danish architect Niels Peder Christian Holsøe (1826–1895), known for the numerous railway stations he designed across Denmark in his capacity of head architect of the Danish State Railways. The station building was listed in 1992.

See also
 List of railway stations in Denmark

References

Citations

Bibliography

External links

 Banedanmark – government agency responsible for maintenance and traffic control of most of the Danish railway network
 DSB – the Danish national train operating company
 Lokaltog – Danish regional railway company operating in the Capital Region and Region Zealand
 Danske Jernbaner – website with information on railway history in Denmark

Slagelse
Railway stations in Region Zealand
Railway stations opened in 1856
1856 establishments in Denmark
Railway stations opened in 1892
1892 establishments in Denmark
Niels Peder Christian Holsøe railway stations
Buildings and structures in Slagelse Municipality
Listed buildings and structures in Slagelse Municipality
Railway stations in Denmark opened in the 19th century